Now Hear This is  the thirteenth album by American pianist and arranger Duke Pearson. It features big band performances recorded in 1968 and released on the Blue Note label.

Reception
The Allmusic review by Stephen Thomas Erlewine awarded the album 4½ stars stating "Duke Pearson returned to a big band setting for Now Hear This!, once again proving his agility and inventiveness as an arranger and leader... Even if much of this music is beautiful, Pearson's arrangements take chances and are unconventional, which means it rewards close listening as well".

Track listing
All compositions by Duke Pearson except where noted

 "Disapproachment" (Frank Foster) - 5:49
 "I'm Tired Crying Over You" (Buddy Johnson) - 3:43
 "Tones for Joan's Bones" (Chick Corea) - 5:33
 "Amanda" - 3:42
 "Dad Digs Mom" (and Mom Digs Dad)" - 2:47
 "Minor League" - 6:37
 "Here's That Rainy Day" (Jimmy Van Heusen, Johnny Burke) - 4:26
 "Make It Good" - 4:41
 "Days of Wine and Roses" (Henry Mancini, Johnny Mercer) - 6:01

Personnel
Duke Pearson - piano, arranger (tracks 2-9)
Jim Bossy, Randy Brecker, Burt Collins, Joe Shepley, Marvin Stamm - trumpet
Garnett Brown, Jimmy Cleveland, Benny Powell - trombone
Kenny Rupp - bass trombone
Jerry Dodgion, Al Gibbons - alto saxophone
Lew Tabackin - tenor saxophone
Frank Foster - tenor saxophone, arranger (track 1)
Pepper Adams - baritone saxophone
Bob Cranshaw - bass
Mickey Roker - drums
Andy Bey - vocals (track 2)

References

Blue Note Records albums
Duke Pearson albums
1969 albums
Albums recorded at Van Gelder Studio